Nanette of the Wilds is a 1916 American drama silent film directed by Joseph Kaufman and written by Willard Mack. The film stars Pauline Frederick, Willard Mack, Macey Harlam, Charles Brandt, Frank Joyner and Daniel Pennell. The film was released on November 26, 1916, by Paramount Pictures.

Plot

Cast 
Pauline Frederick as Nanette Gauntier
Willard Mack as Constable Thomas O'Brien
Macey Harlam as Baptiste Flammant (*as Macey Harlan)
Charles Brandt as Joe Gauntier
Frank Joyner as Andy Joyce
Daniel Pennell as Sergeant Major O'Hara
Wallace MacDonald as Harry Jennings
Jean Stewart as Marie Beaudeaut
Robert Conville as Constable Jevne

Preservation status
The film is now considered lost.

References

External links 
 
 

1916 films
1910s English-language films
Silent American drama films
1916 drama films
Paramount Pictures films
Films directed by Joseph Kaufman
American black-and-white films
Lost American films
American silent feature films
1916 lost films
Lost drama films
1910s American films